Adrian Richard West Room (27 September 1933, Melksham – 6 November 2010, Stamford, Lincolnshire) was a British toponymist and onomastician, a Fellow of the Royal Geographical Society and a prolific author of reference works relating primarily to the origins of word and place-names.

Between 1952 and 1979, Room served in the Royal Naval Reserve, Special Branch, retiring as a Lieutenant Commander.   Before becoming a full-time author, he was employed at King's College School, Cambridge, where he taught modern languages and was a senior house master.   He later, until 1984, worked as a senior lecturer in Russian for the Ministry of Defence.

Selected publications

Place-Names of the World. London: Routledge & Kegan Paul, 1974.
Place-name changes since 1900: A world gazetteer. London: Routledge & Kegan Paul, 1980. 
Naming Names: Stories of Pseudonyms and Name Changes with a Who's Who. London: Routledge & Kegan Paul, 1981. 
Dictionary of Trade Name Origins. London: Routledge & Kegan Paul, 1982. 
Brewer's Dictionary of Modern Phrase & Fable. 2000. (Editor) 
Cassell's Foreign Words and Phrases. London: Cassell & Co., 2000. 
A. to Z. of British Life
Dictionary of Confusable Words
Bloomsbury Dictionary of Place Names in the British Isles
A Dictionary of True Etymologies
Who's Who in Classical Mythology
Dictionary of Pseudonyms: 13,000 Assumed Names and Their Origins (This edition published after his death)
Cassell's Dictionary of Word Histories
Dictionary of Irish Place Names
Cassell's Dictionary of First Names
The Guinness Book of Numbers
Room's Dictionary of distinguishables
Ntc's Dictionary of Changes in Meaning
The Fascinating Origins of Everyday Words
Brewer's dictionary of names
Tuttle dictionary of dedications
Room's Dictionary of Differences
Concise dictionary of word origins
Ntc's Dictionary of Word Origins
Dictionary of Confusing Words and Meanings
Dunces, Gourmands & Petticoats
Cassell Dictionary of Proper Names
A Concise Dictionary of Modern Place Names in Great Britain and Ireland
Dictionary of Changes in Meaning
Nicknames of Places: Origins And Meanings of the Alternate And Secondary
Dictionary of Coin Names. London: Routledge & Kegan Paul, 1987. 
African Placenames
Dictionary of Translated Names and Titles
Dictionary of Cryptic Crossword Clues
Dictionary of Dedications
Room's Classical Dictionary
The Street Names of England
The Hutchinson Pocket Dictionary of Confusible Words
Dictionary of Astronomical Names
A dictionary of contrasting pairs
The Naming of Animals
A Dictionary of Art Titles
Guide to British Place Names
Dictionary of World Place-names Derived from English Names
The Pronunciation of Placenames: A Worldwide Dictionary
Dictionary of place-names in the British Isles
A Dictionary of Music Titles
Alternate Names of Places: A Worldwide Dictionary
Ntc's Dictionary of Trade Name Origins
Placenames of France
Bloomsbury Dictionary of Dedications
Literally Entitled
Encyclopedia of corporate names worldwide
Ntc's Classical Dictionary
Cassell's Dictionary of Modern American History
Hutchinson Pocket Dictionary of First Names
The Hutchinson Pocket Dictionary of Place Names
Placenames of Russia and the Former Soviet Union
Room's Dictionary of Distinguishables and Confusibles
An Alphabetical Guide to the Language of Name Studies
Dictionary Of British Place Names

References

1933 births
2010 deaths
Alumni of the University of Oxford
Fellows of the Royal Geographical Society
People from Melksham
Toponymists
Royal Naval Reserve personnel